William Frederick Truax (born July 15, 1943) is a former American football tight end in the National Football League (NFL) for the Los Angeles Rams and Dallas Cowboys. He played college football at Louisiana State University.

Early years
Truax attended Holy Cross, where he practiced football, basketball, baseball and track. As a senior, he received All-state, All-Prep, All-Catholic, Times-Picayune four-sport Athlete of the Year, honorable-mention All-Southern and All-American nomination spot for Louisiana honors.

College career
Truax accepted a football scholarship from Louisiana State University. As a freshman, he played on the junior varsity team and suffered a broken leg against Mississippi State University.

He became a starter as a sophomore and was mainly used as a blocker for running back Earl Gros, tallying 5 receptions (fifth on the team) for 61 yards (12.2-yard average). 

As a junior, he blocked for running back Jerry Stovall, registering 3 receptions for 101 yards (third on the team), a 33.7-yard average (led the team) and one touchdown. 

As a senior, he was named a team captain, while leading the team with 10 receptions for 112 yards (11.2-yard average) and one touchdown. He also played defense during his career, collecting 2 interceptions and 3 fumble recoveries.

In 2019, he was inducted into the Sugar Bowl's Greater New Orleans Sports Hall of Fame.

Professional career

Cleveland Browns
Truax was selected by the Cleveland Browns in the second round (26th overall) of the 1964 NFL draft. He also was selected by the Houston Oilers in the second round (14th overall) of the 1964 AFL Draft. 

As a 21-year-old rookie, he was converted into an outside linebacker and suffered a torn a hamstring on the first day of training camp. He lost 6 weeks and was traded to the Rams without having played a down for the Browns on August 31, in exchange for a 1965 second round draft choice (#22-Gerry Bussell).

Los Angeles Rams
In 1964, he was tried at defensive end before settling at tight end. In his first 2 seasons he played mainly on the special teams units. In 1966, he began playing in the offense, where his size made him an excellent blocker. He had 7 receptions for 62 yards against the Green Bay Packers.

In 1967, he recorded 37 receptions (tied for second on the team) for 487 yards (third on the team) and 4 touchdowns. He had 6 receptions for 74 yards against the Baltimore Colts.

In 1968, although he was limited with a broken bone in his left wrist for most of the season, he tallied 35 receptions (led the team) for 417 yards (fourth on the team) and 3 touchdowns.

In 1969, he had 37 receptions (fourth on the team) for 431 yards (third on the team) and 5 touchdowns. His best game came against the Atlanta Falcons, collecting 7 receptions for 111 yards and one touchdown.

In 1970, he registered 36 receptions (third on the team) for 420 yards (third on the team) and 3 touchdowns. On May 19, 1971, Truax was traded along with wide receiver Wendell Tucker to the Dallas Cowboys in exchange for wide receiver Lance Rentzel.

Dallas Cowboys
In 1971, he was limited with torn cartilage in his left knee and played 12 games (10 starts), with 4 contests started by future hall of fame tight end Mike Ditka. He only had 15 receptions for 232 yards and one touchdown, but was a part of the Cowboys' Super Bowl VI championship team.

In 1972, he was limited from off-season knee surgery and lost his starting job to Ditka. He was only able to play in 6 games and catch 4 passes for 49 yards. 

In 1973, the Cowboys drafted tight end Billy Joe DuPree in the first round. On September 5, Truax was assigned to the taxi squad because of a stomach disorder (ulcer). He appeared in 2 games and didn't register any stats, before being placed on the injured reserve list on October 26. He was not re-signed after the season.

New York Giants
On April 15, 1974, he was signed as a free agent by the New York Giants. He was released before the start of the season.

Personal life
His cousin Dalton Truax played offensive tackle in the American Football League for the Oakland Raiders.

References

External links
Tight end Billy Truax took talent to seven-year tenure in NFL

1943 births
Living people
Players of American football from New Orleans
American football tight ends
LSU Tigers football players
Los Angeles Rams players
Dallas Cowboys players